Cissusa is a genus of moths in the family Erebidae.

Species
 Cissusa inconspicua (Schaus, 1894)
 Cissusa indiscreta H. Edwards, 1886
 Cissusa mucronata Grote, 1883
 Cissusa spadix Cramer, 1780
 Cissusa valens H. Edwards, 1881

Former species
 Cissusa subtermina (Smith, 1900)

References

External links
 Cissusa at Markku Savela's Lepidoptera and Some Other Life Forms
 Mustelin, T. (2006). Zootaxa 1278: 1-47.
 Natural History Museum Lepidoptera genus database

 
Melipotini
Moth genera